The 1976/77 NTFL season was the 56th season of the Northern Territory Football League (NTFL).

Waratah have won there 13th premiership title while defeating St Marys in the grand final by 13 points.

Grand Final

References

Northern Territory Football League seasons
NTFL